Hydroxyl ion absorption is the absorption in optical fibers of electromagnetic waves, including the near-infrared, due to the presence of trapped hydroxyl ions remaining from water as a contaminant. 

The hydroxyl (OH−) ion, can penetrate glass during or after product fabrication, resulting in significant attenuation of discrete optical wavelengths, e.g., centred at 1.383 μm, used for communications via optical fibres.

See also
Water absorption

References

Fiber optics
Glass engineering and science